Location, Location, Location is a British reality property programme that has aired on Channel 4 since 17 May 2000 and is presented by Kirstie Allsopp and Phil Spencer. The show follows Allsopp and Spencer as they try to find the perfect home for a different set of buyers each week.

A cliché used by property experts is that the three most important factors in determining the desirability of a property are "location, location, location". This tricolon appeared in print as early as 1926, though it is often incorrectly attributed to the real estate magnate Harold Samuel.

Spin-off
A spin-off show, called Relocation, Relocation, began in 2003. It was based on the same format as Location, Location, Location, but each week a couple looked to buy a house, usually outside large urban areas, and also invest in a house or shop in the city, with the help of Kirstie and Phil. The series aired in the winter months, so as not to coincide with the other show. Relocation, Relocation was cancelled in 2011 due to economic conditions making it difficult for people to buy one house, let alone two. Repeats are frequently shown on More4 and in 2022 the first season was available on All 4.

Relocation, Relocation has also been dubbed in Italian and broadcast in Italy by Lei with the name Cambio Casa (Finalmente!).

An Australian version of the show, titled Relocation Relocation Australia, began in 2011.

A Danish version of the show titled, 3 x beliggenhed, began in 2014.

References

External links

2000 British television series debuts
2000s British reality television series
2010s British reality television series
2020s British reality television series
Channel 4 original programming
English-language television shows
Property buying television shows
Television series by Banijay